"I Like It Like That" is a song written and performed by Swedish musician Per Gessle. It was the third and final single from his Son of a Plumber project.

It was originally due to be released on 17 May 2006, the same day that fellow Roxette member, Marie Fredriksson released Sommaräng, the lead single from her then-upcoming album Min bäste vän. The release of "I Like it Like That" was later pushed back a week to 24 May 2006. Although there was no explanation for the changed release date, it could have been that it was to avoid a chart battle between the two Roxette members.

Track listing
Swedish CD single
(0946 3652212 8; 24 May 2006)
"I Like It Like That"
"Plumber in Progress #2"

Charts

References

2006 singles
Per Gessle songs
Songs written by Per Gessle
2005 songs